This is a list of foreign ministers of Dominica.

1978–1979: Leo Irving Austin
1979–1980: Oliver Seraphin
1980–1990: Eugenia Charles
1990–1995: Brian G. K. Alleyne
1995–1998: Edison James
1998–2000: Norris Charles
2000: Rosie Douglas
2000–2001: Pierre Charles
2001–2005: Osborne Riviere
2005–2007: Charles Savarin
2007–2008: Roosevelt Skerrit
2008–2010: Vince Henderson
2010–2014: Roosevelt Skerrit
2014–2019: Francine Baron
2019–2022: Kenneth Darroux
2022–present: Vince Henderson

References

Foreign
Foreign Ministers
Politicians